The Victorians is a 2009 British documentary series which focuses on Victorian art and culture. The four-part series is written and presented by Jeremy Paxman and debuted on BBC One at 9:00pm on Sunday 15 February 2009.

Episodes

Media
A book written by Paxman was published to accompany the series titled The Victorians: Britain Through the Paintings of the Age. In his introduction, Paxman acknowledged that the Irish writer Neil Hegarty had played a significant role in editing the book and bringing it to completion. Paxman was praised by academics and figures in the publishing industry for acknowledging Hegarty's substantial contribution. In the book, Paxman wrote that all television is a collaborative exercise, "so it is rather silly for this book - which accompanies a television series - to appear with only one name on the cover."

A region 2 DVD two disc set The Victorians was released 15 June 2009.

References

External links
 
 Times article by Jeremy Paxman, 7 February 2009

2009 British television series debuts
2009 British television series endings
BBC television documentaries about history during the 18th and 19th centuries